Towel Day is celebrated every year on 25 May as a tribute to the author Douglas Adams by his fans. On this day, fans openly carry a towel with them, as described in Adams' The Hitchhiker's Guide to the Galaxy, to demonstrate their appreciation for the books and the author. The commemoration was first held 25 May 2001, two weeks after Adams' death on 11 May.

Origin 
The importance of the towel was introduced in The Hitchhiker's Guide to the Galaxy original radio series in 1978.  The follow-up book explained the importance of towels in The Hitchhiker's Guide to the Galaxy universe in Chapter 3, using much of the same wording as the original radio series:

The original article that began Towel Day was posted by a user "Clyde" (probably D. Clyde Williamson) at "System Toolbox", a short-lived open source forum.

Chris Campbell and his friends registered the domain name towelday.org to promote the day, reminding people to bring their towels. Towel Day was an immediate success among fans and many people sent in pictures of themselves with their towels.

Recognition 
Several news sources around the world have mentioned Towel Day, including the Norwegian newspaper Aftenposten and the television news show NRK Nyheter, and National Public Radio, Los Angeles.

In May 2010, an online petition was created asking Google to recognize Towel Day with either a Google Doodle or by returning search results in the Vogon language for a day. As of 10 September 2014, the petition had received 5,373 signatures; however, the petition website is now defunct.

2010 
In Canada, Volt, a French/English television show, created a skit in which Towel Day was explained and featured.

In Ecuador, Radio City, a BBC affiliated radio station, interviewed one of the organizers of Towel Day in Toronto to introduce their listeners to Towel Day. The interview was in Spanish and English.

2011 
In the United Kingdom, Planet Rock aired an "Alternative Thought Of The Day" by David Haddock about Towel Day and Siren FM broadcast "Dean Wilkinson & the Importance of International Towel Day".

2012 
In January 2012, The Huffington Post listed Towel Day as one of ten cult literary traditions.

2013 
In recognition of Towel Day, the Norwegian public transportation company Kolumbus gave away a limited number of special towels to customers. Each towel contained an RFID chip that allows a free ride on their buses and boats. In Washington, D.C., the Chevy Chase branch of the District of Columbia Public Library offered prizes for those who wore a towel to the library on Towel Day.

2015 

On Towel Day 2015, Italian astronaut Samantha Cristoforetti sent a "Towel Day greeting" and read aloud a sample from The Hitchhiker's Guide To The Galaxy from the International Space Station.

2016 
Towel Day was celebrated by Briton Tim Peake on the International Space Station.

As Towel Day 2016 fell during the RIPE 72 meeting, the RIPE NCC distributed a beach towel printed with an IPv6 subnet chart (from their training materials).

2018 
The first SpaceX Falcon Heavy rocket launch used a Tesla Roadster as a test payload, emblazoned with the words DON'T PANIC! are shown. This is a reference to the cover of The Hitchhiker's Guide to the Galaxy, which features the same words. In the glove compartment of the car was a copy of the book and a towel, also an item from the novel.

2019 
In the year 2019, Towel Day was celebrated by Don't Panic Labs in Nebraska, U.S., by organizing a donation drive called the "Towel Day Drive" where people were asked to donate new or extremely gently used Towels to the "People's City Mission." Many people also donated money to buy towels.

See also 
 Geek Pride Day, celebrated on the same date
 The Glorious 25th Of May from the works of Sir Terry Pratchett.

References

External links 

 Towel Day - Celebrating the life and work of Douglas Adams
 Towel Day on h2g2
 Fan proposing the idea of making Towel Day an annual event on h2g2
 Television Skit for Towel Day (French/English)
 Interview by Radio City Ecuador for Towel Day 2010 (Spanish/English)

The Hitchhiker's Guide to the Galaxy
Science fiction fandom
Radio fandom
Literary fandom
Unofficial observances
May observances
Recurring events established in 2001
Discordian holidays

es:Douglas Adams#El día de la toalla